Rice vermicelli is a thin form of noodle. It is sometimes referred to as 'rice noodles' or 'rice sticks', but should not be confused with cellophane noodles, a different Asian type of vermicelli made from mung bean starch or rice starch rather than rice grains themselves.

Presentation and varieties
Rice vermicelli is a part of several Asian cuisines, where it are often eaten as part of a soup dish, stir-fry, or salad.
One particularly well-known, slightly thicker variety, called Guilin mǐfěn (桂林米粉), comes from the southern Chinese city of Guilin, where it is a breakfast staple.

Names
Rice vermicelli is widely known in Asia by cognates of Hokkien 米粉 (bí-hún, literally "rice vermicelli"). These include bīfun (Japan), bíjon or bihon (Philippines), bee hoon (Singapore),  bihun or mee hoon (Malaysia and Indonesia), num banh chok (Cambodia), bún (Vietnam), and mee hoon (Southern Thailand).

Naming in Taiwan
Beginning July 1, 2014, Food and Drug Administration of Taiwan rules have been in effect that only products made of 100% rice can be labeled and sold as "米粉" in Taiwan, usually translated as "rice vermicelli" or "rice noodle". If the product contains starch or other kinds of grain powder as ingredients but is made of at least 50% rice, it is to be labeled as "調和米粉", meaning "blended rice vermicelli". Products made of less than 50% rice cannot be labelled as rice vermicelli.

Naming in Philippines
Despite colloquially referred to as rice noodles in the Philippines, nearly all retail "bihon" in the country is made of potato starch instead of rice.

Notable dishes

East Asia

Mainland China

 Yunnan and Guangxi cuisine—famous dishes including crossing-the-bridge noodles, mixian, Guilin noodle and luosifen (snail noodle). Rice noodle is also a main staple of ethnic Tai, Miao and Zhuang cuisine. 
 Cantonese noodles—a large number of Cantonese dishes use this ingredient (called 米粉 maifun or "rice" in Cantonese). Usually the noodles are simmered in broth with other ingredients such as fish balls, beef balls or fish slices.
 Fujian and Teochew cuisine, rice vermicelli is a commonly used noodle and is served either in soup, stir-fried and dressed with a sauce, or even "dry" (without soup) with added ingredients and condiments.

As the term  (mifen) literally only means "rice noodles" in Chinese, there is considerable variation among rice noodles granted this name. In Hubei and historically in much of Hunan, mifen refers to thick, flat rice noodles made using a wet mix, similar to shahe fen. In Changde, the term refer to thick, round noodles that has supplanted the other mifen in Hunan. These are mifen in China, but not rice vermicelli noodles.

Hong Kong

Singapore-style noodles (星州炒米, Xīng zhōu cháo mǐ)—a dish of fried rice vermicelli common in Hong Kong Cantonese-style eateries, inspired by the spicy cuisines of Southeast Asia. This dish is made from rice vermicelli, char siu, egg, shrimp and curry.

Taiwan
Taiwanese fried rice vermicelli is the dry, stir-fried local style (particularly known in the Hsinchu region). Its main ingredients include sliced pork, dried shrimp, and carrots.
A Hsinchu specialty is to serve rice vermicelli 'dry' (乾 gan, not in a soup) with mushroom and ground pork.

South Asia

Indian Subcontinent
 Sevai is a south Indian dish prepared in houses during festive occasions. It is made in different flavours such as lemon, tamarind and coconut milk.
 Sawaeyaa is a dish made from semolina vermicelli cooked in milk sugar and dry nuts. It is eaten on Diwali, Eid, and other festive occasions in northern parts of India and Pakistan.
 शेवया (in Marathi) or shevaya are served to the groom and bride a day before their wedding called halad (हळद) in some parts of Maharashtra.
Paayasam is a South Indian sweet dish made from vermicelli, sago, sugar, spices and nuts and milk.
Idiyappam is a staple South Indian breakfast dish. It is typical of Tamil Nadu, Kerala and other southern Indian states, as well as Sri Lanka, where it is known as string hopper.

Southeast Asia

Cambodia

Cha mee sor is a stir-fry glass noodle dish common in Cambodia. This dish is commonly made during Pchum Ben. It is taken to the temple and given to the ancestors along with other Cambodian dishes. This dish is sold on the streets of Cambodia and can be eaten any time during the year, mostly enjoyed at parties. Cha mee sor is made with vermicelli noodles and ground pork and sautéed with different Asian sauces. Green onions can be used as garnish at the end.

Neorm is a Cambodian cold noodle salad, cabbage and vermicelli noodles being the main ingredients, usually served cold with chicken, pork, or shrimp. A variety of vegetables and mints are added and it is mixed with a homemade sweetened fish sauce, topped with crushed peanuts. This dish can be served and eaten any time of the year. It can also be made vegetarian.

Num banhchok is one of the most popular Khmer dishes, normally served in family gatherings or parties. The typical num banhchok is served with samlor proher, a greenish soup made of fish and kroeung. Fresh vegetables such as chopped cucumbers or bean sprouts can be added as preferred. Num banhchok stalls are usually found in the fresh market and street vendors.

Indonesia

Bihun goreng, in Chinese Indonesian cuisine, is stir-fried rice vermicelli with sweet soy sauce
Bihun kari, rice vermicelli mixed with curry
Bihun rebus or bihun kuah, also Chinese Indonesian cuisine rice vermicelli soup
Lumpia and risoles, several types of spring rolls (gorengan, fritters) with rice vermicelli and vegetable filling
Mie bakso, meatballs served with rice vermicelli soup
Soto (traditional Indonesian soup), various types of which often include rice vermicelli, as in soto ayam
Sup oyong (Chinese okra), vegetable soup with rice vermicelli
Tekwan, a surimi type fish ball soup related to pempek from South Sumatra, also includes rice vermicelli, mushroom, jicama and sedap malam flower

Malaysia 

In Malaysia, rice vermicelli may be found as mihun, mi hoon, mee hoon, bihun, or bee hoon.

There are various types of bihun soup, from pork noodles, chicken meat, fish balls and the list goes on, basically alternatives to different noodles that you prefer.
Ak thui bihun reng is a duck noodle herbal soup
Bihun kari mixed with curry, added with mung bean sprout, fried tofu and red chillies sambal
Bihun soto is in a yellow spicy chicken broth, served with chicken and potato cutlet
Bihun sup is a Malay-style dish, mixed with spiced beef broth or chicken broth; sometimes it comes with sambal kicap (pounded bird's eye chilli mixed with dark soy sauce) as a condiment
Bihun tom yam is mixed with tom yam
Char bihun is a Chinese version of fried noodle
Hokkien mee throughout Malaysia varies considerably due to regional differences
Laksa Sarawak is mixed with a base of sambal belacan, sour tamarind, garlic, galangal, lemon grass and coconut milk, topped with omelette strips, chicken strips, prawns, fresh coriander and optionally lime; ingredients such as bean sprouts, (sliced) fried tofu or seafood are not traditional but are sometimes added
Mee siam is a dry stir-fried style dish in Malaysia

Myanmar

Mohinga—rice vermicelli served with curry gravy and fish, an essential part of Burmese cuisine, considered by many to be the national dish of Myanmar
Mont di—fish soup; there are a number of dishes, the Rakhine version from the Arakanese in western Myanmar is the most popular
Kyar san kyaw—rice vermicelli fried with vegetables; chicken, pork, and seafood are possible additions

Philippines

Pancit bihon (or pancit bihon guisado) is a general term for rice vermicelli dishes with a mixture of stir-fried shrimp, meat (usually pork or chicken) and various vegetables cooked in an adobo-style sauce with garlic, black pepper, soy sauce, patis (fish sauce), and other spices to taste. Usually topped with hard-boiled eggs and served with calamansi as a condiment. It is also a common filling for the empanadas of the Tausūg people known as pastil.
Pancit choca (or pancit choca en su tinta) is a black seafood noodle dish made with squid ink and rice vermicelli from Cavite.
Pancit palabok is a rice vermicelli dish with shrimp sauce, topped with shrimp, pork, crushed chicharon, tinapa (smoked fish) flakes, hard-boiled eggs, scallions, and toasted garlic. Served with calamansi.
Pancit miki at bihon guisado is a combination of pancit bihon and pancit miki (egg noodles).
Pancit canton at bihon guisado is a combination of pancit bihon and pancit canton (wheat noodles).

Singapore
Kerabu bee hoon is a Nyonya-style rice vermicelli dish, mixed with herbs and other seasonings.
Hokkien mee,  commonly in Singapore, consists of rice vermicelli mixed with yellow noodles and fried with shrimp, sliced cuttlefish and pork bits. Hokkien mee throughout Malaysia varies considerably due to regional differences.
Satay bee hoon is rice vermicelli served with spicy peanut satay sauce, common in Singapore.
 Seafood bee hoon is rice vermicelli cooked with sauce and served in tasty seafood broth and seafood such as lobster, crayfish, clams, scallops and prawns.

Vietnam

Bánh hỏi—a Vietnamese dish consisting of rice vermicelli woven into intricate bundles and often topped with chopped scallions or garlic chives sauteed in oil, served with a complementary meat dish.
Bún riêu—rice vermicelli in soup with crab meat. It has a fresh sour flavor, so Vietnamese like to enjoy it in summer. There are many restaurants in Vietnam that sell this dish.
Bún bò Huế—rice vermicelli in soup with beef from Huế.
Bún chả—a dish from Hanoi consisting of grilled fatty pork and over a plate of white rice vermicelli and herbs with a side dish of dipping sauceBún thịt nướng—a Vietnamese dish consisting of grilled pork (often shredded) and vermicelli noodles over a bed of greens (salad and sliced cucumber), herbs and bean sprouts. Also, it often includes a few chopped spring rolls, spring onions, and shrimp.  It is commonly served with roasted peanuts on top and a small bowl of nước mắm pha (fish sauce with garlic, chilli, sugar, lime juice, water or coconut juice).Gỏi cuốn''—rice vermicelli with pork, shrimp and herbs in a rice paper roll. It is served with nước chấm.

See also

 Chinese noodles
 Khao poon
 Laksa
 List of noodles
 List of noodle dishes
 Pancit
 Sevai
 Shahe fen
 Khanom chin

References

External links
 Rice noodles

Noodles
Southeast Asian cuisine
Chinese noodles
Vietnamese noodles
Rice dishes